Marie-Angélique Josèphe Brûlon, née Duchemin (January 20, 1772 – July 13, 1859), was a French soldier.

Born in Dinan into a soldier family, Duchemin married a soldier named Brûlon and served from 1792 to 1799 in the defence of Corsica. She initially fought disguised as a man along with her husband, but was eventually discovered to be a woman. Despite this, she had shown such valour in battle that she was allowed to remain in service. She survived her husband and was proficient with sword and dagger in hand-to-hand combat. In 1797, she asked to be allowed into Les Invalides after she received severe wounds in the siege of Calvi, but was denied seven years. When she received the pension in 1804, she was also promoted to the rank of lieutenant.

Napoleon III decorated her as a Chevalier (Knight) of the French Legion of Honour on August 15, 1851, the first woman to receive that honor. The first request on her behalf, filed by marshal Sérurier in 1804, had not been granted.

Sources 

1772 births
1859 deaths
Chevaliers of the Légion d'honneur
Female wartime cross-dressers
People from Dinan
French military personnel of the Napoleonic Wars
French military personnel of the French Revolutionary Wars
Women in 18th-century warfare
French female military personnel